The M-3 is a north–south motorway in Pakistan, connecting the Lahore end of the M-2 to M-4 near Abdul Hakeem.

The M-3 motorway is parallel motorway of M-4 motorway and took eastern route from Lahore to Abdul Hakeem city, while M-4 motorway which connects M-2 to same Abdul Hakeem city.

The distance between Lahore to Multan via N5 is 323 km according to official website of National Highway Authority

Inauguration
The M-3 Motorway (Lahore to Abdul Hakeem Motorway) was inaugurated on 31 March 2019. The M-3 Motorway merges with M-4 Motorway at Abdul Hakeem (Darkhana).

Route
The M-3 Motorway starts at the M-2 Motorway after crossing the famous Ravi Toll Plaza in Lahore. It then goes southwest from Lahore and ends where it meets the M-4 motorway near the city of Abdul Hakim located near a small village named Darkhana.

M-3 Motorway is a 6 lane controlled access highway with 3 rest areas along the route. The full length of 'Lahore to Abdul Hakeem' section of M-3 was inaugurated on 30 March 2019 and was opened to traffic on 1 April 2019 on the full route from Lahore to Abdul Hakeem.

River Ravi
The route of M-3 Motorway runs almost parallel to River Ravi although the river might not be seen easily anywhere along this motorway.

Railway Line Bridges
M-3 Motorway (Lahore to Abdul Hakeem Motorway) has 3 Railway Line Bridges as follows:

1) After crossing Darkhana Toll Plaza i.e. start of M-3 Motorway (railway line coming from Khanewal, towards Shorkot Cantt & vice versa)

2) Before Pirmahal Interchange (railway line coming from Shorkot Cantt, towards Pir Mahal & vice versa)

3) Before Tandlianwala Service Area (railway line coming from Pir Mahal, towards Sheikhupura & vice versa)

Lahore to Multan Motorway (M-3 + M-4 Motorway)
The distance between Lahore to Multan is calculated to facilitate travelers as South end of M-3 Motorway doesn't provide exits/ entry to any District or Divisional Headquarter directly. For that purpose it merges with M-4 Motorway (Pindi Bhattian- Faisalabad- Multan Motorway) and the first Divisional Headquarter nearest to South end is Multan.

Lahore to Abdul Hakeem section (M-3 Motorway) = 230 km

Multan-Abdul Hakeem section (M-4 Motorway) = 103 km

Total Distance, Lahore to Multan, on M-3 + M-4 = 333 km.

The stretch of M-4 Motorway from Abdul Hakeem to Multan is built up with 4 lanes.

This is more than the previous distance of 323 km on National Highway N5, but the average driving speed was significantly less there. The speed allowed on this motorway is 120 km/h for L.T.V. & 110 km/h for H.T.V. So the time taken for traveling is significantly reduced as compared to N-5.

Exits/Entry for Multan City
M-4 motorway's passes through the South of Multan city and there are 4 interchanges for Multan city:
 
1. Shamkot (Khanewal/ N-5) Interchange (Northeast or East of Multan): Khanewal, E-5 Expressway; Multan city & DHA Multan.

2. Shah Rukn-e-Alam/ Makhdoom Rasheed Interchange (South of Multan): Vehari; Multan City Lari Adda (Buses Stands & Truck Stands).

3. Shah Shams Tabrez (Bahawalpur Road/ N-5) Interchange (South of Multan): Bahawalpur & Lodhran; BCG Chowk Multan, MIKD, Multan.

4. Sher Shah Interchange (South of Multan): continues as M-5 Motorway (Multan to Sukkur Motorway) & giving exits to Shujabaad; Multan Cantt; Muzaffargarh, D.G. Khan, Sakhi Sarwar, Rakhi Gaj, Fort Munro, Loralai, Qila Saif-ullah & Quetta.

M-3/M-4 Junction
At Abdul Hakeem (Darkhana) M3 Motorway joins with the somewhat parallel M4 Motorway (Pindi Bhattian- Faisalabad- Multan Motorway) in a "Y" junction form. Analyzing "Y" when heading North from Multan (Khanewal/ Shamkot), the base/ long arm of "Y" represents Motorway (M4) coming from Multan, while the left arm of "Y" represents Motorway (M4 continuation) going towards Faisalabad, Pindi Bhattian & subsequently M4 Motorway merging with M2 Motorway (Lahore Islamabad Motorway) for way up to Islamabad & Peshawar (M1 Motorway). The right arm of "Y" shows the Motorway going towards Lahore (start of M3 Motorway).

Junctions and interchanges

Service Areas
1. Near Nankana Sahib interchange
2. Samundari interchange Chak 441gb
3. Phlore Near Rajana Interchange
4. Tandlianwala Service Area Near Chak No 363 G,B

Rest Area
1. Samundari interchange
2. Rajana interchange 
3. Pir Mahal interchange
4. Darkhana road near Abdulhakim interchange near chak 17gb kake shah

See also
Motorways of Pakistan
National Highways of Pakistan
Transport in Pakistan
National Highway Authority

References

External links
official website of National Highway Network

M03
Toll roads in Pakistan